Bugry is a rural locality (a village) in Churovskoye Rural Settlement, Sheksninsky District, Vologda Oblast, Russia. The population was 2 as of 2002.

Geography 
Bugry is located 21 km northeast of Sheksna (the district's administrative centre) by road. Kelbuy is the nearest rural locality.

References 

Rural localities in Sheksninsky District